Denis Favier (born May 18, 1959) is a French officer known for commanding the mission to remove hijackers from Air France Flight 8969. From 2013 to 2016, he has been the General-Director of the French Gendarmerie. 

Favier was born on 18 May 1959 in Lons-le-Saunier. In 1979 he joined the military academy of Saint-Cyr. In 1992 he was appointed commander of the National Gendarmerie Intervention Group (GIGN). In 1994 he was promoted to chef d'escadron (major). In 1994, he commanded the assault against the Armed Islamic Group of Algeria, who had earlier taken the passengers of Air France Flight 8969 hostage. Following this incident, he gave interviews in silhouette or facial obscurity, which he still does until today  as it was believed that the  co-militants of the terrorists his team killed offered a reward for his assassination. In 2007, after various positions in the Gendarmerie, he was again appointed commander of the GIGN, which underwent restructuring. In 2008 he joined the French forces leading the assault on the pirates who had captured the ship Ponant near Somalia. In 2008 he was promoted to a general. In 2013 he was appointed director-general of the Gendarmerie. On 9 January 2015 he led the operation to arrest Chérif and Saïd Kouachi following a hostage situation in Dammartin-en-Goële. The Kouachi brothers were suspected of being the perpetrators of the shooting at Paris newspaper Charlie Hebdo on 7 January 2015.

Awards and decorations

Titles 
Grand Officer of the Legion of Honor (2015)
Citation to the Order of the Army with Cross of Military Valor (1995)
Citation to the order of the regiment with cross of military valor (2009)
Medal of the National Gendarmerie with bronze grenade (2003)
Overseas Medal “Lebanon” - Vermeil (2010)
National Defense Medal - Bronze level (1988)
French commemorative medal - clip ex-Yugoslavia (2005)
Medal of Honor for Act of Courage and Dedication - Gold
Medal of Honor for Act of Courage and Dedication - 1st Class Silver
Bronze medal of honor of the prison administration (1993)
Quote without a simple cross to the order of the Gendarmarie regiment (1992)
Citation without cross to the order of the Army Corps (2003)
Officer of the Order of Merit of the Italian Republic (2013)
Officer of the National Order of Côte d'Ivoire
Commander of the National Order of the Lion of Senegal
Grand Cross of the Order of Merit of the Civil Guard (Spain)
Commander of the Order of Civil Merit (Spain)

References

1959 births
French military personnel
People from Lons-le-Saunier
École Spéciale Militaire de Saint-Cyr alumni
Living people
Recipients of orders, decorations, and medals of Senegal